Alberto Sonsol Cohen (November 26, 1957 – March 25, 2021) was a Uruguayan sports journalist, sportscaster and television presenter.

Biography 
Alberto Sonsol Cohen was born in barrio Palermo, Montevideo to David Sonsol and Leonor Cohen. Coming from a Jewish family, Sonsol attended Liceo Yavne.

In January 1984, he emigrated to Israel, where he worked as a waiter in an Argentine restaurant in Tel Aviv. However, the same year he returned to Uruguay to work as a sports journalist.

On March 12, 2021, it was announced that he had contracted COVID-19. On March 16, he was hospitalized at the British Hospital of Montevideo, after a low level of oxygen was detected in his blood, and four days later he was transferred to the ICU due to worsening symptoms. He passed away on March 25, 2021, at the age of 63. He was buried on April 2 in the Israelite Cemetery of La Paz. Due to the restrictions due to the pandemic, a funeral was not held, but a funeral procession was held from Club Atlético Atenas, of which Sonsol was a supporter, to the Centenario Stadium.

Career 
He began his career as a basketball announcer in 1984. A year later he reported his first full match for Radio Universal. Since the 1990s, he was a panelist on the program La Hora de los Deportes aired on National Television. However, during his 35 years in the media, he hosted the program 6.25 Basketball on Teledoce, and until 2017 he was a sports journalist and was in charge of sports commentary on Radio Sarandí Sport 890.

Between 2015 and 2020 he presented the Uruguayan version of the Israeli format Raid the Cage, entitled Escape perfecto and aired on Channel 10. He was accompanied by Annasofía Facello, who also co-presented the spin-off featuring celebrities, along with Claudia Fernández. From 2020 until his death, he was part of Punto Penal and the Polémica en el bar Uruguay program panel. He also was the presenter of the sports section in Subrayado, the news division of Channel 10. Since February 2021 he was part of the cast of the humorous program La Peluquería de Don Mateo. After his death he was replaced by Sebastián Almada.

Accolades 

 2016: Golden Iris Award and Best Male TV Presenter
 2017: Iris Award for best radio sportscaster

Personal life 
He was married to Patricia Datz, with whom he had three children: Diego, Alejandro and Micaela Sonsol. Alejandro "Lali" and Diego also work in the media, as sportscasters and presenters.

References 

Uruguayan sports journalists
Uruguayan television presenters
Uruguayan radio presenters
Deaths from the COVID-19 pandemic in Uruguay
Uruguayan Jews
Burials at Cementerio Israelita, La Paz